Thomas Kretschmann (born 8 September 1962) is a German actor who has appeared in many European and American films. His notable roles include Lieutenant Hans von Witzland in Stalingrad (1993), Hauptmann Wilm Hosenfeld in The Pianist (2002), Hermann Fegelein in Downfall (2004), Captain Englehorn in King Kong (2005), Major Otto Remer in Valkyrie (2008), the voice of Professor Z in Cars 2 (2011), and as the journalist Jürgen Hinzpeter in A Taxi Driver (2017). He also portrayed Baron Wolfgang von Strucker in the Marvel Cinematic Universe films Captain America: The Winter Soldier (2014) and Avengers: Age of Ultron (2015).

Kretschmann has twice been nominated for the Deutscher Fernsehpreis for Best Actor. He is also a European Film Award and Nika Award nominee.

Career
At the age of 25, he began acting, starring in numerous European films and television series, including Westler in 1985. Then in 1991, Kretschmann was awarded the Max Ophüls Prize for best young actor for his role in Der Mitwisser. He went on to star in his first full-length feature, the 1993 film Stalingrad. He achieved international recognition for his role as sadomasochistic rapist and murderer Alfredo Grossi in Dario Argento's The Stendhal Syndrome.

Although popular in his homeland, Kretschmann did not achieve notice in Hollywood until his role as Hauptmann Wilm Hosenfeld in Roman Polanski's 2002 film The Pianist. In the years since, Kretschmann has often portrayed military officers in films about the Third Reich. In the 2004 film Downfall, Kretschmann played Hermann Fegelein, a Waffen-SS colonel and brother-in-law to Eva Braun. In the 2008 thriller Valkyrie, Kretschmann played Major Otto Ernst Remer, a Wehrmacht officer who had a key role in stopping the 20 July Plot. Prior to the casting of Tom Cruise, Kretschmann had been considered to play Colonel Claus von Stauffenberg. Kretschmann also played Adolf Eichmann in a 2007 biographical film.

Kretschmann made his first appearance on American television in 2003 when he guest starred in 2 episodes of 24. He later also appeared in Relic Hunter. In 2004, Kretschmann played Timothy Cain, a ruthless Umbrella Major, in Resident Evil: Apocalypse. In the same year, he appeared in the French film Immortal with Linda Hardy. The film was notable for its use of a digital backlot and interaction between Computer-generated characters and real actors. In 2005, Kretschmann won a role in Peter Jackson's remake of King Kong, where he worked again with Adrien Brody, with whom he had costarred in The Pianist.

The following year, Kretschmann began to win acclaim for his role in Butterfly: A Grimm Love Story (Rohtenburg in Germany). A psychological thriller, the movie co-stars Keri Russell and was inspired by the Armin Meiwes cannibalism case. It was scheduled for a March 2006 release in Germany, but its showing is under injunction after Meiwes successfully sued to have it banned on grounds of infringement of his personality rights. At the 2006 Festival de Cine de Sitges, Kretschmann shared the Best Actor award for his performance in this film with his co-star Thomas Huber. Kretschmann also shared Best Actor with Huber at the 2007 Puchon International Fantastic Film Festival.

In 2008 Kretschmann was hired for the role of Johann Krauss in Guillermo del Toro's Hellboy II: The Golden Army. However, after several trials del Toro decided that Kretschmann's voice and the mechanical sound FX to Johann's suit did not mesh well, so the part went to Seth MacFarlane. That same year he appeared in the action thriller Wanted, alongside Angelina Jolie, Morgan Freeman and James McAvoy.

2009 saw Kretschmann guest star in the American science-fiction TV drama series FlashForward, as well as a major secondary part in the British biopic The Young Victoria as King Leopold I of Belgium. This film also received three Academy Awards nominations in 2010 for Best Art Direction, Makeup, and won for Costume Design.

The next year he returned to Germany, guest starring as himself in the romantic comedy Rabbit without Ears 2. Kretschmann then moved to Malaysia in the summer to shoot his scenes for the German biopic Jungle Child based on the eponymous bestseller by Sabine Kuegler. The film was released in early 2011. Walt Disney Pictures confirmed in November 2010, that Kretschmann would star as one of the voice talents in the Pixar film Cars 2. The film was released in the United States on 24 June 2011, in the United Kingdom on 22 July and in Germany on 28 July.

Kretschmann starred as Captain Kurt Brynildson in the 2011–2012 ABC original paranormal/adventure/horror television series The River about a group of people on a mission to find a missing TV explorer in the Amazon.

Kretschmann signed a multi-film contract with Marvel Studios to play Baron Wolfgang von Strucker, and first appeared as the character in a post-credits scene of the 2014 film Captain America: The Winter Soldier. He had a larger role as the character in the 2015 movie Avengers: Age of Ultron.

Kretschmann often re-records his own parts for the German dubs of his screen roles. Aside from acting, Kretschmann has also worked as a fashion model, including a stint as the face for a scent by Hugo Boss.

Filmography

Awards
 Best Young Actor (Der Mitwisser), Max Ophüls Festival, 1991
 Best Actor (Rohtenburg), Sitges – Catalan International Film Festival, 2006
 Best Actor (Rohtenburg), Bucheon International Fantastic Film Festivalm, 2007

References

External links

 

1962 births
Living people
20th-century German male actors
21st-century German male actors
German male film actors
German male television actors
German expatriate male actors in the United States
East German defectors
East German emigrants to West Germany
People from Bezirk Halle
People from Dessau-Roßlau